Greek frigate Elli (F450) is the lead ship of the Greek  of frigates and the third Hellenic Navy ship by that name.  The class is based on the Royal Netherlands Navy's  and was built in a Dutch shipyard; however, unlike later members of its class in the Hellenic Navy, it was not originally in Dutch service, but was sold directly to Greece.

The Elli was built at the Koninklijke Maatschappij de Schelde in Vlissingen, Holland, along with the frigate Limnos as part of a commission for the two ships from the Greek government.  Her maiden voyage was on October 10, 1981 under her first captain, Grigoris Demestihas.  She arrived in Greece on November 15 of that year.

The Elli took part in the Persian Gulf War from 1990–91, enforcing the UN resolution on Iraq in the neighborhood of the  Red Sea.

References

External links
Official Hellenic Navy page for Standard Class Frigates (English)

Elli-class frigates
Ships built in Vlissingen
1981 ships
Gulf War ships of Greece
Frigates of Greece
Frigates of the Cold War